Aethes munda is a species of moth of the family Tortricidae. It is found in Turkey.

References

Moths described in 2003
munda
Moths of Asia